Mendoza del Valle del Momboy is a parish in Valera Municipality, Trujillo State, Venezuela.

Populated places in Trujillo (state)